Molecular breast imaging can refer to:
 Scintimammography (detects gamma rays often from a technetium 99 compound)
 Positron emission mammography